Gérard Frémy (12 March 1935 – 19 January 2014) was a French pianist, composer, and percussionist.

Biography 
A student with Yves Nat at the Conservatoire de Paris, Frémy ended his studies by winning First prize at sixteen.

He was designated by Marcel Dupré and the Association française d’action artistique (Culturesfrance) as a Soviet government scholarship holder. For three years, he studied at the Tchaikovsky Conservatory of Moscow with Heinrich Neuhaus and then rubbed shoulders with Sviatoslav Richter, Emil Gilels, etc. Forty concerts in the USSR and recordings for the state radio will punctuate his stay in Russia. He then performed with equal success in most European countries, the United States and Japan, and participated in some of the most important festivals. 

He was soloist in ensembles such as Ensemble Ars Nova and Musique Vivante, and played as part of Stockhausen's group at Expo '70 in Osaka (1970). His extensive repertoire extended from J.S. Bach to Éliane Radigue. 

Gérard Frémy was perhaps the closest French performer to John Cage's universe, known, in particular, for his interpretation of the Sonatas and Interludes and Music of Changes. Remarkably familiar with contemporary creation, Frémy gave many world premieres of some of the most important composers of the time, including Luc Ferrari's Société II, Si le piano était un corps de femme, and Und so weiter, as well as Stockhausen's Pôle pour deux. Composer Michèle Bokanowski dedicated Pour un pianiste to him. 

An important part of Frémy's career has been devoted to pedagogy, teaching at the Conservatoire de Paris and the Conservatoire National de région de Strasbourg, piano, and chamber music classes. Many of his students have won prizes and distinctions in important international competitions. Among his pupils were Cédric Tiberghien, Nicolas Horvath, and Nicolas Stavy.

Among Frémy's favourite composers were Mozart, Schubert, Schumann, Debussy, Ravel, and Cage.

Some personal compositions 
 Easyroad
 Duo
 Eine kleine Freundschaftmusik

References

External links 
 Official website
 Hommage à Gérard Frémy (Conservatoire de Paris)

1935 births
2014 deaths
Place of birth missing
20th-century French male classical pianists
20th-century French composers
Conservatoire de Paris alumni
Academic staff of the Conservatoire de Paris
21st-century French male classical pianists
French male composers
21st-century French composers